Palazzo Arese Borromeo is an historic noble palace situated in Cesano Maderno, in the Province of Monza and Brianze, Lombardy, Italy.

Background 
The northern wing of the palazzo was built in the 16th century by Bartolomeo il Vecchio (1508–1562). Giulio I Arese (1575-1627) began expansions around 1620. The largest parts of the palazzo were built between 1654 and 1670 by count Bartolomeo III Arese, then president of the Senate of Milan under rule of Philip IV and Charles II of Spain, turning the countryside villa into an exemplary suburban noble residence for the House of Arese.

The palazzo is currently property of the comune of Cesano Maderno.

The interiors of the palazzo are visitable thanks to guided tours on Saturday and Sunday. The park is open every day, with free entrance.

Description

Architecture 

The residence is remains as it was built by Bartolomeo III, demonstrating his taste and cultural references. The project of the palazzo must be read as part of a more complex urban planning project, with the function of giving the new nobile residence maximum visibility in the region of Cesano.

The palazzo is in late baroque Lombard style, and is notable for its Genovese loggia, its internal court yard, and its gardens all'Italiana. The building has a simple but elegant quadrangular structure, flanked by service buildings that complicate the plan. The principle facade, characterized by its nobile sobriety, is composed of an exedra and doric pilasters. In the northern wing there is a chapel, and In the southern wing there is a tower, built upon the remains of its medieval predecessor.

Interiors 
The palazzo is lined with frescos by the most prominent Milanese baroque artists, including Ercole Procaccini the Younger, the Montalto brothers, Antonio Busca, Giovanni Ghisolfi, Giuseppe Nuvolone, and Federico Bianchi. The painted cycles are part of a complex iconographic project, involving recreated landscapes and mythology, to communicate the economic and political power of the House of Arese under Spanish Habsburg rule.

The Salone d'Onere dei Fasti Romani 

The most important room in the palazzo is the Salone d'Onore, also known as Salone of the Fasti Romani. It consists of two bands: the inferior band depicts the history of Rome, and the superior band displays dames and signori, musicians, servants, and mendicants peering over a balustrade as though a public observation of the feasts for which the room was dedicated.

Gardens and nymphaeum 
The gardens are composed of a large natural park, large fountains, a nymphaeum, an ancient example of an ice house, and a more private giardino all'Italiana on the northern side.

Hotel Parco Borromeo 
The palazzo hosts a 4 stars Hotel with different services, including the visit of different historical sites of the Milan metropolitan area. The Hotel delivers an eating service through restaurant "Il Fauno" which has 3 different locations for dining: the restaurant, the veranda and the garden.

Gallery

References

Sources 

 Tesori di Lombardia - La ghiacciaia ed il Palazzo Arese Borromeo a Cesano Maderno - Bellavite Editore Missaglia

Further reading 

 Palazzo Arese Borromeo Cesano Maderno
 Lombardia Beni Culturali: il Palazzo Arese Borromeo di Cesano Maderno
 Bartolomeo III Arese and the Italian Senate
 University of San Raffaele - Faculty of Philosophy at Palazzo Arese Borromeo in Cesano Maderno
 Association of Friends of Palazzo and Park Arese Borromeo

Palaces in Lombardy
Baroque palaces in Italy